Anna Marcella Giffard (1707-1777) was an Irish stage actress.

She was a member of the Lyddal acting family of Dublin, and began appearing herself at the Smock Alley Theatre under the name of Nancy Lyddal in the 1720s. In around 1728 she married the English actor Henry Giffard who had been acting at Smock Alley for some years. He had previously been married to Mary Lyddal, probably Anna Marcella's sister, with whom he had two children including William Giffard. After the marriage she was generally styled Mrs Giffard on playbills.

She accompanied her husband to London in 1729 and frequently appeared alongside him over the coming years. She made her British debut at the Goodman's Fields Theatre, and this became a base for the couple after Henry took over management of the company and attempted to turn it into the third major London theatre, despite operation without a patent. The Licensing Act 1737 largely ended this attempt, and in subsequent years they played in many theatres around Britain and Ireland as well as the Drury Lane, Covent Garden and Haymarket Theatres. Along with her husband she left the stage in October 1748 and retired to live in Brentford.

Her sister Sarah Hamilton was also an actress who worked extensively on the Irish and British stage. Her nephew William Hamilton also became an actor.

Selected roles
 Mominia in The Orphan (1729)
 Matilda in The Widow Bewitched (1730)
 Mrs Sprightly in The Fashionable Lady (1730)
 Lady Essex in The Fall of the Earl of Essex (1731)
 Deamira in Scanderbeg (1733)
 Beleyda in The Parricide (1736)
 Henrietta Maria in King Charles I (1737)
Julia in The Independent Patriot (1737)
 Pinup in A Tutor for the Beaus (1737)
 Semandra in The Fatal Retirement (1739)
 Emira in Mustapha (1739)
 Charlotte in Love the Cause and Cure of Grief (1743)
 Palmira in Mahomet the Imposter (1744)
 Clara in The Astrologer (1744)
 Martian in Regulus (1744)
 Lady Fanciful in The Provoked Wife (1748)

References

Bibliography
 Highfill, Philip H, Burnim, Kalman A. & Langhans, Edward A. A Biographical Dictionary of Actors, Actresses, Musicians, Dancers, Managers, and Other Stage Personnel in London, 1660-1800: Garrick to Gyngell. SIU Press, 1978.

18th-century Irish people
Irish stage actresses
British stage actresses
18th-century Irish actresses
18th-century British actresses
1707 births
1777 deaths
Irish emigrants to Great Britain